Richard D. Norton (c. 1939 – 1998) was an American pilot, scientist, and explorer. He was the pilot of the first single engine plane to fly around the world via the North and South Poles in 1987.

A graduate of Stanford University, he served in the US Air Force between 1961 and 1965. He was a pilot for TWA for 26 years.  At TWA, he flew the Lockheed L-1011 Tristar. He was married to a woman, Lourdes Veras.

He was the Director of the Institutes for the Achievement of Human Potential from 1982 to 1992.

On January 20, 1987, he completed his record flight, flown on a Piper Malibu, along with co-pilot, West German, Calin Rosetti.

He died of cancer at age 59.

References

1939 births
1998 deaths
American aviators
American aviation record holders